Waraqu (Aymara and Quechua for cactus, Hispanicized spelling Huaraco) is a   mountain in the Andes of Peru. It is located in the Arequipa Region, Condesuyos Province, Cayarani District, and in the La Unión Province, Puyca District.

References 

Mountains of Peru
Mountains of Arequipa Region